The Swiss rail network is noteworthy for its density, its coordination between services, its integration with other modes of transport, timeliness and a thriving domestic and trans-alp freight system. This is made necessary by strong regulations on truck transport, and is enabled by properly coordinated intermodal logistics.
 
With  network length, Switzerland has a dense railway network, and is the clear European leader in kilometres traveled: 2,505 km per inhabitant and year (2019). Worldwide only the Japanese travel more by train. 

Virtually 100% of its network is electrified, except for the few tracks on which steam locomotives operate for tourism purposes only. There are 74 railway companies in Switzerland. The share of commuters who travel to work using public transport (as main mode of transport) is 30%. The share of rail in goods transport performance by road and rail (modal split) is 39%.

Switzerland was ranked first among national European rail systems in the 2017 European Railway Performance Index for its intensity of use, quality of service and strong safety rating. Switzerland had excellent intensity of use, notably driven by passenger traffic, and a good rating for quality of service and a very good rating for safety. Switzerland captured high value in return for public investment with cost to performance ratios that outperform the average ratio for all European countries.

Switzerland is a member of the International Union of Railways (UIC). The UIC Country Code for Switzerland is 85.

Standard-gauge lines

Three quarters of the Swiss rail network is at standard gauge, comprising , administered mostly by three companies. Important railway stations are the Zürich HB (466,800 passengers per day on a working day), Bern (210,000 ppd), Basel SBB (114,200 ppd), Lausanne (108,900 ppd), Winterthur (108,000 ppd), Luzern (96,200 ppd), Zürich Oerlikon (85,700 ppd), Zürich Stadelhofen (83,300  ppd), Olten (81,300 ppd), and Geneva (73,700 ppd).

Swiss Federal Railways

Swiss Federal Railways (SBB CFF FFS) is the largest railway company in Switzerland and handles the majority of national and international traffic. It operates the main east–west track in the Swiss Plateau area serving all larger Swiss cities and many smaller ones, and the north–south routes through the Alps via the Gotthard Line through the Gotthard Base Tunnel (Milano-Chiasso-Lugano-Luzern/Zurich-Basel line) and the Simplon Tunnel (Domodossola to Brig-Lausanne-Geneva line).

Total route length: .

BLS

BLS (Bern-Lötschberg-Simplon) operates 10% of the standard-gauge network. It manages the second major Alpine route Bern-Brig via both Lötschberg Tunnels (base and summit) and connection at Brig with SBB's Simplon Tunnel to Italy.

Total route length: .

SOB

The hourly exrpess train running on this route is called Voralpen Express referring to the pre-alpine landscape it runs through from Northeastern to Central Switzerland. The line touches Herisau, the main town of the small Appenzell Ausserrhoden canton, the Toggenburg valley, the lakeside dam on Lake Zurich, the high moorland of Rothenturm, Lake Zug and Lake Lucerne.

Rail links to other countries

Standard gauge 
Austria – same voltage 15 kV, 16.7 Hz AC
France – voltage change 15 kV, 16.7 Hz AC / 25 kV, 50 Hz AC or 1,500 V DC
Germany – same voltage 15 kV, 16.7 Hz AC
Italy – voltage change 15 kV, 16.7 Hz AC / 3 kV DC
Liechtenstein – same voltage 15 kV, 16.7 Hz AC

Although Austria, Germany and Liechtenstein all use the same voltage as Switzerland, dedicated types of locomotives are necessary due to Switzerland using narrower pantographs.

The German national railway company Deutsche Bahn (DB) owns cross-border lines from the German border to Basel Badischer Bahnhof station, which is also operated by DB. It also owns and operates an east–west line across the canton of Schaffhausen that forms a link in the largely German High Rhine Railway, and jointly owns Schaffhausen railway station with the Swiss Federal Railways.

The German DB operates longer-distance trains from Germany to Swiss cities, including ICE services to Basel, Zurich, Berne, Chur and Interlaken. On the other hand, the Swiss operator SBB runs Eurocity services into Germany on the lines from Zurich to Stuttgart and Munich. SBB also operates a regional line termed Seehas on German territory north of Lake Constance close to the Swiss border.  

The French-Swiss joint-venture TGV Lyria operates high-speed trains between Paris and South-France with services to Geneva, Lausanne, Basel and Zurich.

The Austrian Railjet by ÖBB operates the service between Zurich and several destinations in Austria. The service runs via Buchs SG and calls Innsbruck, Salzburg and Vienna besides others.

SBB and Trenitalia jointly operate EuroCity services between Switzerland and Italy. These services are running between Geneva and Milan or even Venice via the Simplon Tunnel. Between Basel and Milan via Berne and the Lötschberg Base and Simplon Tunnels, and between Zurich and Milan via the Gotthard route.

Narrow-gauge lines

RhB and MGB

The Rhätische Bahn (RhB) is the longest metre-gauge railway in Switzerland, linking Arosa, Disentis, Davos, St. Moritz in the high Alps, and Tirano in Italy with Chur, a rail junction with the SBB. It passes through the upper Rhine Valley and several side valleys, as well as the Engadine, the upper valley of the river Inn. The Bernina Pass is the highest point on this line, at 2253 m. It is also the highest rail crossing in Europe. Total length: 366 kilometres.

The former Furka Oberalp Bahn (FO) was a metre-gauge railway in the high southern alps. Its name referred to two passes, the Furka Pass and the Oberalp Pass. The Furka Pass lies at the upper end of the Rhône valley. The Oberalp Pass is the highest point on this line at 2033 metres, and lies at the upper end of the Rhine valley. The total length of the railway was 100 kilometres, and the line runs from Disentis to Brig. Brig is a rail junction with the SBB and BLS and sits at the north end of the Simplon tunnel on the Milan to Lausanne CFF line and Milan to Bern BLS line.

The former BVZ Zermatt-Bahn (BVZ; BVZ means Brig Visp Zermatt) was a short line between Brig and Zermatt. It passes through the Visp and Matt Valleys, tributaries of the Rhône. Total length: 43 kilometres.

In 2003, the FO and BVZ merged to form the Matterhorn Gotthard Bahn (MGB).

The Glacier Express (GEX) runs on the combined three line route St. Moritz/Davos-Filisur-Chur-Disentis-Andermatt-Brig-Visp-Zermatt. A one-day trip in panoramic-view cars takes tourists from St. Moritz/Davos to Zermatt, or vice versa, through some of the most spectacular scenery of the Alps. It is the longest distance train, the journey from Zermatt to St. Moritz lasting about 8 hours.

Further narrow-gauge lines
The Appenzeller Bahnen (AB) with its total of 77 km of mainly metre-gauge tracks just recently combined (2006) the earlier separate Trogenerbahn from St. Gallen to Trogen, the standard-gauge railway from Rorschach, Switzerland to Heiden, Switzerland, the short track of the funicular from Rheineck to Walzenhausen, as well as the previous Appenzeller Bahnen. The AB connects main spots within both Appenzells with St. Gallen and Altstätten in the Alpine Rhine Valley.

The Chemin de Fer Montreux Oberland Bernois (MOB) line runs 75 kilometres from Montreux on Lake Geneva to Zweisimmen, with a connecting line to Lenk in the Simmental. The section from Montreux to Zweisimmen, approximately 63 kilometres long, is part of the "Golden Pass Panorama" trip from Montreux to Lucerne, a trip which combines rides on the MOB, the BLS and the Zentralbahn (zb).

From Interlaken, the narrow-gauge Brünigbahn section of the Zentralbahn (zb) runs 74 kilometres further to Lucerne. It skirts Lake Brienz and passes through the range of mountains to the north of the lake via Brünig Pass, and then drops into the Sarner Aa valley to Lucerne. The zb also runs the line between Lucerne and Engelberg.

The Chemins de fer du Jura (CJ), the railways of the Jura canton in northern Switzerland, is an 85-kilometre rail network of which 74 km is metre gauge, the remaining 11 km being standard gauge. It connects La Chaux-de-Fonds to Glovelier and Tramelan, both via Le Noirmont.

The Aargau Verkehr company operates two unconnected narrow gauge lines; the Menziken–Aarau–Schöftland line operates in the centre of the canton of Aargau, whilst the Bremgarten–Dietikon line operates across the border between the canton of Zurich and eastern Aargau.

The Berner Oberland Bahn (BOB) is a 24-kilometre line from Interlaken to Lauterbrunnen and Grindelwald. It begins at Interlaken Ost station and divides at Zweilütschinen, about 10 kilometres south of Interlaken. The western branch leads to Lauterbrunnen, while the eastern branch leads to Grindelwald. It is possible to make a loop by taking the Lauterbrunnen branch and returning via the Grindelwald branch. The two branches are connected by the Wengernalp Bahn.

The Wengernalpbahn (WAB) is a 19-kilometre line from Lauterbrunnen to Grindelwald, leading over the Eiger ridge at the junction station of Kleine Scheidegg. In the winter, this junction is a ski resort served by many lifts and trails, as well as the rail line. Skiers can ride the train from the valleys below to return to the top of the runs.

The Jungfraubahn (JB), which is also rack-and-pinion throughout, starts at Kleine Scheidegg and runs 9 kilometres through tunnels in the Eiger and Mönch, leading to the "Jungfraujoch," a saddle between the Mönch and the Jungfrau summits. At the saddle are a visitor centre and an observatory. The Aletsch Glacier, largest in Europe, runs to the south toward the Rhône valley.

The Bergbahn Lauterbrunnen-Mürren (BLM) is 6 km long, divided into two independent parts, the first part being a cable car (which runs above the old funicular railway, which was replaced in 2006), the second an adhesion railway.

The Chemin de fer Martigny–Châtelard (MC) is 19 km long, with one rack railway section, in the canton of Valais.
It connects with the Saint-Gervais–Vallorcine railway in France, the joint services being marketed as
Mont-Blanc Express.

In the canton of Vaud, metre-gauge railways include the Chemin de fer Nyon-St-Cergue-Morez, the Chemin de fer Bière-Apples-Morges, the Chemin de fer Yverdon–Ste-Croix, the Chemin de fer Bex–Villars–Bretaye and the Chemin de fer Lausanne–Echallens–Bercher, as well as part of the longer MOB.

The Ferrovia Lugano–Ponte Tresa (FLP), in canton Ticino, runs 12.3 kilometres from Lugano to Ponte Tresa.

The Gornergrat Bahn climbs for 9 kilometres from an elevation of 1600 metres near the Zermatt station of the Zermatt RR to a 3000-metre high-end station on the shoulder of the Monte Rosa Mountain. The entire route is a rack-and-pinion railway.

At Brienz the Brienz Rothorn Bahn (BRB), a steam-hauled rack railway, ascends to near the summit of the Brienzer Rothorn.

Narrow-gauge links to adjacent countries 

 Italy:
 Bernina Railway (Rhaetian Railway), break-of-gauge and voltage change at Tirano
 Domodossola–Locarno railway line (FART (ferrovie autolinee regionali ticinesi)) through the Swiss Centovalli and Italian Valle Vigezzo.

Urban rail

Trams

There are trams operating on nine systems in seven Swiss cities. Street-running tramways are nearly
all . The Chemin de fer Bex–Villars–Bretaye (BVB)
in Bex is more of a mixed interuban light rail line connected to a rack railway but it does have some street running portions, particularly in Bex where the BVB operates along the right of way of a tramway system originally built in the 1890s.

S-Bahn
In many parts of Switzerland suburban commuter rail service is today known as S-Bahn. Clock-face scheduling in commuter rail has been first put in place on the line Worb Dorf - Worblaufen near Bern in 1964. In 1968 followed the Golden Coast Express on the right side of Lake Zurich. 1982 clock-face scheduling was introduced all over Switzerland. The term S-Bahn has been used since 1990 for the Zürich S-Bahn, 1995 for Bern S-Bahn and 1997 with the Basel Regional S-Bahn. Other services include S-Bahn Luzern and S-Bahn St. Gallen. But also other terms for commuter rail are in use like Stadtbahn Zug. Around Fribourg, it is known as Réseau Express Régional (RER), in the region of Geneva the term is Léman Express and in the canton of Ticino Treni Regionali Ticino Lombardia (TILO). The commuter rail networks of Zurich, Basel, Geneva and Ticino provide also cross-border transportation services into Germany, France and Italy].

Tourist railways
List of heritage railways and funiculars in Switzerland
List of mountain railways in Switzerland

High-speed railways

History

The construction and operation of Swiss railways during the 19th century was carried out by private railways. The first internal line was a 16 km line opened from Zürich to Baden in 1847, operated by the Swiss Northern Railway. By 1860 railways connected western and northeastern Switzerland but the Alps remained an insurmountable barrier for railways, which need low gradients. The first trans-alpine railway and north-south axis in Switzerland finally opened in 1882. It was the Gotthard Railway, with at its heart the Gotthard Tunnel, passing well below the Gotthard Pass. A second line was opened even lower under the Simplon Pass in 1906 (the Simplon Railway), and a third under the Lötschberg in 1913 (the Lötschberg Railway).

In 1901 the major railways were nationalised to form Swiss Federal Railways. During the first half of the twentieth century they were electrified and slowly upgraded. After the Second World War rail rapidly lost its share of the rail market to road transport as car ownership rose and more roads were built. From 1970 the Federal Government has become more involved in upgrading the railways, especially in urban areas and on trunk routes under the Rail 2000 project. In addition, two major trans-alpine routes—the Gotthard Railway and the Lötschberg approach to the Simplon—were rebuilt under the NRLA project. As a consequence, two new flat routes through the Alps opened in the early 21st century: The Lötschberg Base Tunnel in 2007 and the Gotthard Base Tunnel in 2016.

Integration of services

Between rail services
Services on the Swiss railway are integrated with each other and with other forms of public transport, such as local railways, postal buses, boats and cable transports, often in direct proximity, to minimise transfer times. Unlike its European neighbours, Switzerland has not developed a comprehensive high-speed rail network, with the running speed on its one stretch, called the Rothrist-Mattstetten line, of relatively high-speed line being 200 km/h. Instead the priority is not so much the speeding up of trains between cities, but the reduction of connection times through the nodal system. Journey times on main lines between hubs are multiples of 15 minutes so that on the hour or half-hour all trains stand in the main stations at the same time, thus minimising connection times. Indeed, the above-mentioned Rothrist-Mattstetten line reduces journey times from Bern to Zurich from 72 minutes to 57 minutes, in keeping with the clock-face scheduling.

Between modes of transport
Rail timetables are integrated with the extensive network of postal buses (branded as PostBus) which serve both plain and high mountain villages. For example, on postal bus line 12.381 the 10:35 from the mountain village of Les Haudères is planned to arrive in the regional city of Sion at 11:20 where a train departs the station (located next to the bus station) at 11:24 for Visp. Indeed, it is a familiar sight to for the postal cars to be already lined up outside the station for the arriving train. From this perspective, the Swiss rail network functions as the core of a wider public transport network. Other modes of transport concerned by the integrated timetable are boats (for instance at Thun railway station) and cable transports (for instance at Fiesch railway station).

Costs and subsidies

Although public investment is positively correlated with a given railway system's performance, the European Railway Performance Index finds differences in the value that countries receive in return for their public cost. The 2017 Index found Switzerland captures high value for money relative to the average ratio of performance to cost among European countries.

Passenger transport
In 2012, the total costs for passenger transport on Swiss railway network was CHF 8.88 billion, of which CHF 4.46 billion (50%) were due to infrastructure costs, CHF 3.98 billion (45%) were costs of transportation means, CHF 427 million due to environmental and health costs, and CHF 25 million due to accidents.

CHF 4.28 billion, or 48.2%, were paid by passengers, and CHF 4.15 billion (or 47%) came from rail subsidies provided by federal, cantonal, and municipal contributions.  CHF 426 million (or 4.8%) were contributed by the common weal (accident and health insurances, environmental funds etc.).

Freight transport
In 2012, the total costs for freight transport on Swiss railway network was CHF 2.063 billion, of which CHF 779 million (37.8%) were due to infrastructure costs, CHF 900 million (43.6%) were costs of transportation means, CHF 59 million due to environmental and health costs, and CHF 325 million (15.8%) due to accidents.

CHF 1.058 billion, or 51.3%, were paid by customers, and CHF 122 million (5.9%) by transporting companies, while CHF 555 million (26.9%) were subsidised by federal, cantonal, and municipal contributions. CHF 328 millions (15.9%) were contributed by the common weal (accident and health insurances, environmental funds etc.).

See also
List of railway companies in Switzerland
High-speed rail in Switzerland
History of rail transport in Switzerland
Swiss locomotive and railcar classification
Transportation in Switzerland

Notes and references

Notes

References

Bibliography

External links

 Swiss narrow-gauge railways